This is a record of Costa Rica's results at the FIFA World Cup. The FIFA World Cup, sometimes called the Football World Cup or the Soccer World Cup, but usually referred to simply as the World Cup, is an international association football competition contested by the men's national teams of the members of Fédération Internationale de Football Association (FIFA), the sport's global governing body. The championship has been awarded every four years since the first tournament in 1930, except in 1942 and 1946, due to World War II.

The tournament consists of two parts, the qualification phase and the final phase (officially called the World Cup Finals). The qualification phase, which currently take place over the three years preceding the Finals, is used to determine which teams qualify for the Finals. The current format of the Finals involves 32 teams competing for the title, at venues within the host nation (or nations) over a period of about a month. The World Cup Finals is the most widely viewed sporting event in the world, with an estimated 715.1 million people watching the 2006 tournament final.

Costa Rica's history at the FIFA World Cup is relatively recent, as they missed the tournament for sixty years since its inception in 1930 until their first appearance at the 1990 FIFA World Cup, the team's only participation at the tournament in the 20th century. The 21st century has seen Costa Rica qualifying to all editions of the FIFA World Cup, with the exception of the 2010 edition, which they narrowly missed.

In 2014, Costa Rica had its best performance at a FIFA World Cup. On 6 December 2013, Costa Rica was drawn into Group D with Uruguay, Italy, and England, the only group in FIFA World Cup history to feature three former world champions who, at the time, stood within the top 10 of the FIFA Men's World Ranking. Expectations for Costa Rica were overwhelmingly low, and that the team would finish in the thirty-second place. Instead, Costa Rica topped the group undefeated, with two victories and one draw, and only one goal received. After defeating Greece at the round of 16 through the penalty shoot-outs, and losing through the same means at the quarter-finals against the Netherlands, Costa Rica left the World Cup among the eight best teams, undefeated, and conceding only two goals, the least of all participants of the 2014 FIFA World Cup. Sports-news outlets such as Goal and Mundo Deportivo rank Costa Rica's performance in 2014 as one of the biggest surprises in FIFA World Cup history. Such a performance at the World Cup boosted Costa Rica's prestige in the international scene, as fifteen of the twenty-three players of the squad changed teams in the two transfer windows following the World Cup, including goalkeeper Keylor Navas signing for Real Madrid. Both the Costa Rican performance at the 2014 World Cup and Navas' subsequent, successful stint with Real Madrid had a significant impact on Costa Rican sports, economy, tourism, and society.

Costa Rica ranks third in FIFA World Cup appearances within the CONCACAF region, and first within the UNCAF subregion, in which they hold as many participations as the rest of Central America combined. Costa Rica remains the only Central American team to win a match at a World Cup, which they have done six times, and the only team within that region to qualify past the group stage, which they have done twice.

The Borges family, namely father Alexandre Guimarães and son Celso Borges, have accompanied Costa Rica through all the team's appearances at the FIFA World Cup. Guimarães participated as a player in 1990, then as a coach in 2002 and 2006, while Celso played in 2014, 2018, and 2022.

Overall record

*Denotes draws including knockout matches decided via penalty shoot-out.

FIFA World Cup record by country

Matches

1990 FIFA World Cup

2002 FIFA World Cup

2006 FIFA World Cup

2014 FIFA World Cup

2018 FIFA World Cup

2022 FIFA World Cup

Player appearances

1990 FIFA World Cup squad
2002 FIFA World Cup squad
2006 FIFA World Cup squad
2014 FIFA World Cup squad
2018 FIFA World Cup squad
2022 FIFA World Cup squad

Goalscorers

Fifteen Costa Ricans have scored for the national team throughout their six participations at the FIFA World Cup.

In addition to those players, Swiss goalkeeper Yann Sommer scored an own goal for Costa Rica in 2018.

Individual awards
Golden Glove 1990: Luis Gabelo Conejo (shared)

References

External links
 FIFA.com – Costa Rica on FIFA.com

 
Costa Rica
World Cup